HMS Galatea was a  26-gun, sixth-rate, wooden screw frigate in the Royal Navy, launched in 1859 and broken up 1883.

Service
She was first assigned to the Channel Squadron in 1862 under Captain Rochfort Maguire. From there she served both in the Baltic and the Mediterranean. Then from 1863 to 1865 to the North America and West Indies Station based in Bermuda and Halifax.

On 9 November 1865 the Galatea and HMS Lily participated in a reprisal raid on Cap-Haïtien, bombarding the forts defending the harbour and landing government troops. The raid was provoked by rebel forces having attacked the British Consulate on 23 October 1865 and the loss of  that same day in the fighting that followed.

In 1866, after a refit, she went on a world cruise, under the command of Prince Alfred, Duke of Edinburgh.

On 2 November 1868, she ran aground in Plymouth Sound and was damaged. It was estimated that it would take several days to repair her. While in Sydney, Galatea was placed in the Fitzroy Dock at Cockatoo Island Dockyard in 1870.

On 18 May 1882 she conveyed the Duke of Edinburgh to the official opening of the new Eddystone Light.

Paintings
While in Halifax, Galatea inspired a trio of dramatic paintings by ship portrait artist John O'Brien. In 1866, after a refit, she went on a world cruise, under the command of Prince Alfred, Duke of Edinburgh.

Notes

References
 
 Lyon, David & Winfield, Rif: The Sail and Steam Navy List: All the Ships of the Royal Navy 1815-1889 Chatham Publishing, 2004. .

Gallery

External links
 
 

1859 ships
Frigates of the Royal Navy
Ships built in Woolwich
Age of Sail frigates of the United Kingdom
Victorian-era frigates of the United Kingdom
Maritime incidents in November 1868